Awakening is an album by The Pharaohs which was originally released in 1971 on Scarab Records, Chicago. It was reissued by Luv N' Haight Records in 1996.

Track listing 
 "Damballa"                  (Louis Satterfield)               7:50  
 "Ibo"                       (Oye Bisi Nalls, Fred Walker)             3:43  
 "Tracks of My Tears"        (Smokey Robinson, Pete Moore, Marv Tarplin) 3:45  
 "Black Enuff"               (Pharaoh Don "Hippmo")                     2:55  
 "Somebody's Been Sleeping"  (Lamont Dozier, Brian Holland)           3:30  
 "Freedom Road"              (Pharaoh Ki)                        5:15  
 "Great House"               (Pharaoh Don "Hippmo", Pharaoh Ki)                12:14

Personnel 

 Pharaoh Don "Hippmo" (Don Myrick) - alto, tenor and baritone saxophones, flute, cowbell
 Pharaoh Black Herman - alto saxophone, quinto drum
 Pharaoh Ki (Charles Handy) - trumpet, backing vocals, flugelhorn, alto horn, African shawm, percussion
 Pharaoh (Big) Willie Woods (Willie Woods) - trombone, bassoon, baritone horn, big black drum
 Pharaoh Aaron Ifah Dodd (Aaron Dodd) - tuba, baritone horn, tambourine
 Pharaoh Yehudah Ben Israel (Yackov Ben Israel) - guitars, lead vocals
 Pharaoh Ealee Satterfield (Louis Satterfield) - bass, backing vocals, cowbell
 Pharaoh Alious (Alious C. Watkins, Jr.) - drums, tumba
 Pharaoh Derf Reklaw Raheem (Fred Walker) - African drums, backing vocals, tumba, flute, congas, cowbell
 Pharaoh Shango Njoko - African drums, backing vocals, tumba
 Pharaoh Oye Bisi (Oye Bis Nalls) - African drums, cowbells, congas, tambourine

References 

The Pharaohs albums
1971 debut albums